The 2011–12 season will be the 51st season of competitive association football in Algeria.

Promotion and relegation

Pre-season

National teams

Algeria national football team

2012 Africa Cup of Nations qualification

2013 Africa Cup of Nations qualification

International Friendlies

Algerian women's national football team

League season

Ligue Professionnelle 1

Ligue Professionnelle 2

Ligue Nationale du Football Amateur

Groupe Est

Groupe Centre

Groupe Ouest

Inter-Régions Division

Groupe Ouest

Groupe Centre Est

Groupe Centre Ouest

Groupe Est

Ligue Régional I

Ligue Régionale de football de Blida

Ligue Régionale de football de Constantine
A total of 16 teams contest the division, including 12 sides remaining in the division from last season, two relegated from the Ligue Inter-Régions de football, and two promoted from Ligue Régional II.

Ligue Régionale de football de Ouargla

Women's football

Diary of the season

Deaths

Retirements

Notes

References